Penallta Rugby Football Club is a Welsh rugby union team based in Ystrad Mynach in the county borough of Caerphilly. Penallta RFC is a member of the Welsh Rugby Union and is a feeder club for the Newport Gwent Dragons.

History
Penallta Rugby Football Club is based in Ystrad Mynach. The rugby club was inaugurated by a group of miners from Penallta colliery in  1952 and moved from a number of different social addresses until it settled at Ystrad Fawr, hosting both its club and playing ground there. On 1 November 1991 Penallta Colliery shut down but the RFC continued to play under its name. In 2008 Penallta moved from Ystrad Fawr to their new headquarters across the road at Trinity Fields; Ystrad Fawr, its surrounding playing fields and listed buildings were bulldozed to make way for the new Ystrad Mynach Hospital.

The club colours are blue and gold and the first team are known as the Pitmen, the club being immensely proud of its mining heritage.

Penallta became a full Welsh Rugby Union member in 2004 and since then it has won Divisions 3, 4 and 5 South East, plus the Silver Ball trophy in 2005. During the 2007/08 season Penallta were promoted to Division 1 East.

One of Penallta's biggest Junion Union achievements was winning the Worthington Welsh 'Brewers' Cup in 2001. It was the only time the club won the cup in its junior union history.

In 2012 Penallta returned to the Millennium Stadium and won the Swalec Plate against North Wales side Nant Conwy. Captain Kieran Mahoney lifted the trophy to cap a season during which Penallta embarked on an 18-match unbeaten run, narrowly finishing runner-up to rivals Ystrad Rhondda in the league.

To complete a hat-trick of successful Millennium Stadium visits since the turn of the century, Penallta Youth won the Welsh Youth Cup in 2014 against Gilfach Goch. The Youth Cup was one of an amazing seven trophies amassed by the youth squad during an unbeaten season.

Mike Voyle, a resident of Ystrad Mynach, is the only Penallta player to have represented Wales. He won 21 caps as a tight forward between 1997 and 2001.

Penallta's most capped player is Lee Acreman, with over 600 1st team appearances for the club. The most successful player in Penallta's history is Craig Phillips who captained the 1st team on six occasions and won the Player of the Year award on no less than five occasions, his career lasting between 1976 and 1992.

Current ex Penallta players who are thriving for higher placed clubs include Dai Flanagan (Cardiff Blues/Ospreys/Llanelli RFC), Gareth Davies (Wales 7s/ Cardiff Blues/Cardiff RFC), Steffan Jones (Dragons/Crosskeys RFC/Bedford Blues), Elliot Dee (Dragons), Scott Matthews (Dragons/Crosskeys RFC), Jack Condy (Scarlets), Arwel Robson (Newport RFC / Dragons), Ellis Shipp Dragons, Wales U20s) and Shaun Powell (Cardiff RFC).

Penallta is also known for its excellent matchday programmes, written by Mike Guilfoyle and Martyn Rowe. Extracts from the programmes were made into a book in 2007 called "Shaking the Tree Boss - Portraits of a Welsh Rugby Club".

Senior Club honours
2021-22 WRU National Plate - Winners
2016-17 WRU National Plate - Winners
2014-15 WRU Division One East Champions
2014-15 Glamorgan County Silver Ball Trophy - Winners
2011-12 Swalec Plate - winners
2007-08 WRU Division Two East - runners up
2006-07 WRU Division Three East Champions
2006-07 Glamorgan County Silver Ball Trophy - finalists
2005-06 WRU Division Four South East - Champions
2004-05 WRU Division Five South East - Champions
2004-05 Glamorgan County Silver Ball Trophy - Winners

Penallta Storm Rugby League

Penallta RFC has run a highly successful Junior Rugby League division since 2009 and are part of the Welsh Conference Junior League

2011 - Storm U17s Rugby League - Welsh Champions
2011 - Storm U13s Rugby League - Welsh Champions
2010 - Storm U17s Rugby League - Welsh Champions
2010 - Storm U15s Rugby League - Welsh Champions
2009 - Storm U17s Rugby League - Welsh Champions

Notable former players
  Mike Voyle
  Elliot Dee
  Richard Silver
  Buddy Ollie

References

Rugby clubs established in 1952
Welsh rugby union teams